Patrick Doran (born 5 June 1959) is a British rallycross driver of Irish origin, living in Thorverton, Devon. His oldest son, Liam Doran, became a rallycross driver too.

Doran, sometimes nicknamed "Plastic Paddy", is a former four-time British Rallycross Champion. Doran was also the runner-up in the European Rallycross Championship in 1992, behind Will Gollop, also from Great Britain. He also raced a Ford RS200 in the Pikes Peak International Hill Climb.

Calling Lydden Hill Race Circuit his home, in 2008 he became the owner of the Kentish motorsports venue.

Racing record

FIA European Rallycross Championship results

Division 2

Division 1

Supercar

References

English racing drivers
1959 births
Living people
European Rallycross Championship drivers
Sportspeople from Devon